The Grishk Dam is a dam and power plant on the Helmand River, located near Grishk in Helmand Province, Afghanistan.

A 2003 technical journal noted that the Grishk power plant was commissioned on an irrigation canal in 1945, and had two damaged and obsolete 1.2 megawatt units which would cost US$3 million to repair.

In 2005, a group of twenty Taliban fighters were captured by a joint US-Afghan operation in their attempt to blow up the dam.

References

Dams in Afghanistan
Helmand River
Buildings and structures in Helmand Province
Dams completed in 1945
1945 establishments in Afghanistan